Cystopteris diaphana, the greenish bladder-fern or diaphanous bladder-fern, is a fern in the family Cystopteridaceae.

Distribution 
It is found locally on the Atlantic seaboard of Europe.

Status in Britain 
The species was found for the first time in Britain in February 2000 on the banks of the River Camel in Cornwall (Murphy & Rumsey, 2005).

References 

diaphana
Ferns of Europe
Flora of Southwestern Europe
Flora of Great Britain
Flora of Italy
Flora of the Azores